Cybaeopsis is a genus of tangled nest spiders first described by Embrik Strand in 1907, and transferred from Agelenidae to Amaurobiidae by Pekka T. Lehtinen in 1967. They all occur in North America except for three species; C. lodovicii, C. theoblicki and C. typica.

Members of this genus closely resemble those of the genus Callobius, especially the females. It is considered a senior synonym of Callioplus, but not of Alauximus, which is a synonym of Tugana.

Species
The former C. crassa and C. infumata have both been moved to the Cuban genus, Tugana, and several species have synonyms with the name "Amaurobius", such as C. armipotens and C tibialis.  this genus contains twelve species:
Cybaeopsis armipotens (Bishop & Crosby, 1926) – USA
Cybaeopsis euopla (Bishop & Crosby, 1935) – USA, Canada
Cybaeopsis hoplites (Bishop & Crosby, 1926) – USA
Cybaeopsis hoplomachus (Bishop & Crosby, 1926) – USA
Cybaeopsis lodovicii Ballarin & Pantini, 2022 – Italy
Cybaeopsis macaria (Chamberlin, 1947) – USA
Cybaeopsis pantopla (Bishop & Crosby, 1935) – USA
Cybaeopsis spenceri (Leech, 1972) – USA
Cybaeopsis theoblicki (Bosmans, 2021) – Portugal
Cybaeopsis tibialis (Emerton, 1888) – USA, Canada
Cybaeopsis typica Strand, 1907 – Russia (Sakhalin, Kurile Is.), Japan
Cybaeopsis wabritaska (Leech, 1972) – USA, Canada

References

Amaurobiidae
Araneomorphae genera
Spiders of North America
Taxa named by Embrik Strand